Sayyid Mohammad Khatami (born 14 October 1943) is an Iranian reformist politician who served as the fifth president of Iran from 3 August 1997 to 3 August 2005. He also served as Iran's Minister of Culture from 1982 to 1992. Later, he was critical of the government of subsequent President Mahmoud Ahmadinejad.

Little known internationally before becoming president, Khatami attracted attention during his first election to the presidency when he received almost 70% of the vote. Khatami had run on a platform of liberalization and reform. During his election campaign, Khatami proposed the idea of Dialogue Among Civilizations as a response to Samuel P. Huntington's 1992 theory of a Clash of Civilizations. The United Nations later proclaimed the year 2001 as the United Nations' Year of Dialogue Among Civilizations, on Khatami's suggestion. During his two terms as president, Khatami advocated freedom of expression, tolerance and civil society, constructive diplomatic relations with other states, including those in Asia and the European Union, and an economic policy that supported a free market and foreign investment.

On 8 February 2009, Khatami announced that he would run in the 2009 presidential election but withdrew on 16 March in favour of his long-time friend and adviser, former Prime Minister of Iran Mir-Hossein Mousavi. The Iranian media are forbidden on the orders of Tehran's prosecutor from publishing pictures of Khatami, or quoting his words, on account of his support for the defeated reformist candidates in the disputed 2009 re-election of Mahmoud Ahmadinejad.

Early life and education
Khatami was born on 14 October 1943, in the small town of Ardakan, in Yazd Province. Khatami holds the title of Sayyid, which means that he claims direct patrilineal descent from the Islamic prophet Muhammad. He married Zohreh Sadeghi, the daughter of a professor of religious law, and niece of Musa al-Sadr, in 1974 (at the age of 31). The couple have two daughters and one son: Laila (born 1975), Narges (born 1980), and Emad (born 1988).Khatami's father, Ayatollah  Ruhollah Khatami, was a high-ranking cleric and the Khatib (the one who delivers the sermon for Friday prayers) in the city of Yazd in the early years of the Iranian Revolution.

Khatami's brother, Mohammad-Reza Khatami, was elected as Tehran's first member of parliament in the 6th term of parliament, during which he served as deputy speaker of the parliament. He also served as the secretary-general of Islamic Iran Participation Front (Iran's largest reformist party) for several years. Mohammad Reza is married to Zahra Eshraghi, a feminist human rights activist and granddaughter of Ruhollah Khomeini (founder of the Islamic Republic of Iran). 

Khatami's other brother, Ali Khatami, a businessman with a master's degree in Industrial Engineering from Polytechnic University in Brooklyn, served as the President's Chief of Staff during President Khatami's second term in office, where he kept an unusually low profile.

Khatami's eldest sister, Fatemeh Khatami, was elected as the first representative of the people of Ardakan (Khatami's hometown) in 1999 city council elections.

Mohammad Khatami is not related to Ahmad Khatami, a hardline cleric and Provisional Friday Prayer Leader of Tehran.

Mohammad Khatami received a BA in Western philosophy at Isfahan University, but left academia while studying for a master's degree in educational sciences at Tehran University and went to Qom to complete his previous studies in Islamic sciences. He studied there for seven years and completed the courses to the highest level, Ijtihad. After that, he briefly settled in Germany to chair the Islamic Centre in Hamburg from 1978 to 1980.

Before serving as president, Khatami was a representative in the parliament from 1980 to 1982, supervisor of the Kayhan Institute, Minister of Culture and Islamic Guidance (1982–1986), and then for a second term from 1989 to 24 May 1992 (when he resigned), the head of the National Library of Iran from 1992 to 1997, and a member of the Supreme Council of Cultural Revolution. He is a member and chairman of the Central Council of the Association of Combatant Clerics. Besides his native language Persian, Khatami speaks Arabic, English, and German.

Presidency (1997–2005)

Running on a reform agenda, Khatami was elected president on 23 May 1997, in what many have described as a remarkable election. Voter turnout was nearly 80%. Despite limited television airtime, most of which went to the conservative Speaker of Parliament and favored candidate Ali Akbar Nateq-Nouri, Khatami received 70 percent of the vote. "Even in Qom, the center of theological training in Iran and a conservative stronghold, 70% of voters cast their ballots for Khatami." He was re-elected on 8 June 2001 for a second term and stepped down on 3 August 2005 after serving his maximum two consecutive terms under the Islamic Republic's constitution.

Khatami supporters have been described as a "coalition of strange bedfellows, including traditional leftists business leaders who wanted the state to open up the economy and allow more foreign investment" and "younger voters". Khatami’s ascendancy was a prelude to a dynamic reform thrust that injected hope into Iranian society, whipped up a dormant nation after eight years of war with Iraq in the 1980s and the costly post-conflict reconstruction, and incorporated terms in the political lexicon of young Iranians that were not previously embedded in the national discourse, nor did they count as priorities for the majority of the people.

The day of his election, 2 Khordad, 1376, in the Iranian calendar, is regarded as the starting date of "reforms" in Iran. His followers are therefore usually known as the "2nd of Khordad Movement".

Khatami is regarded as Iran's first reformist president, since the focus of his campaign was on the rule of law, democracy and the inclusion of all Iranians in the political decision-making process. However, his policies of reform led to repeated clashes with the hardline and conservative Islamists in the Iranian government, who control powerful governmental organizations like the Guardian Council, whose members are appointed by the Supreme Leader. Khatami lost most of those clashes, and by the end of his presidency many of his followers had grown disillusioned with him.

As President, according to the Iranian political system, Khatami was outranked by the Supreme Leader. Thus, Khatami had no legal authority over key state institutions such as the armed forces, the police, the army, the revolutionary guards, the state radio and television, and the prisons. (See Politics of Iran).

Khatami presented the so-called "twin bills" to the parliament during his term in office, these two pieces of proposed legislation would have introduced small but key changes to the national election laws of Iran and also presented a clear definition of the president's power to prevent constitutional violations by state institutions. Khatami himself described the "twin bills" as the key to the progress of reforms in Iran. The bills were approved by the parliament but were eventually vetoed by the Guardian Council.

Generality
Press freedom, civil society, women’s rights, religious tolerance, dialogue and political development were concepts that constituted the core of Khatami’s ideology, who as a cleric faced immeasurable pressure on behalf of the orthodox seminarians over the changes he was advocating. He inducted his Westward charm offensive by engaging the European Union, and became the first Iranian president to travel to Austria, France, Germany, Greece, Italy, Norway and Spain. From the University of St Andrews in Scotland to the World Economic Forum in Davos and the UNESCO headquarters in Paris, he was frequently solicited to give talks at reputed venues to articulate the new Iranian vision and tell the world how he wanted to portray his people’s aspirations.

Economic policy

Khatami's economic policies followed the previous government's commitment to industrialization. At a macro-economic level, Khatami continued the liberal policies that Rafsanjani had embarked on in the state's first five-year economic development plan (1990–1995). On 10 April 2005, Khatami cited economic development, large-scale operations of the private sector in the country's economic arena and 6% economic growth as among the achievements of his government. He allocated $5 billion to the private sector for promoting the economy, adding that the value of contracts signed in this regard has reached $10 billion.

A year into his first term as president of Iran, Khatami acknowledged Iran's economic challenges, stating that the economy was, "chronically ill...and it will continue to be so unless there is fundamental restructuring".

For much of his first term, Khatami saw through the implementation of Iran's second five-year development plan. On 15 September 1999, Khatami presented a new five-year plan to the Majlis. Aimed at the period from 2000 to 2004, the plan called for economic reconstruction in a broader context of social and political development. The specific economic reforms included "an ambitious program to privatize several major industries ... the creation of 750,000 new jobs per year, average annual real GDP growth of six percent over the period, reduction in subsidies for basic commodities...plus a wide range of fiscal and structural reforms". Unemployment remained a major problem, with Khatami's five-year plan lagging behind in job creation. Only 300,000 new jobs were created in the first year of the plan, well short of the 750,000 that the plan called for. The 2004 World Bank report on Iran concludes that "after 24 years marked by internal post-revolutionary strife, international isolation, and deep economic volatility, Iran is slowly emerging from a long period of uncertainty and instability".

At the macroeconomic level, real GDP growth rose from 2.4% in 1997 to 5.9% in 2000. Unemployment was reduced from 16.2% of the labor force to less than 14%. The consumer price index fell to less than 13% from more than 17%. Both public and private investments increased in the energy sector, the building industry, and other sectors of the country's industrial base. The country's external debt was cut from $12.1 billion to $7.9 billion, its lowest level since the Iran-Iraq cease-fire. The World Bank granted $232 million for health and sewage projects after a hiatus of about seven years. The government, for the first time since the 1979 wholesale financial nationalization, authorized the establishment of two private banks and one private insurance company. The OECD lowered the risk factor for doing business in Iran to four from six (on a scale of seven).

The government's own figures put the number of people under the absolute poverty line in 2001 at 15.5% of the total population – down from 18% in 1997, and those under relative poverty at 25%, thus classifying some 40% of the population as poor. Private estimates indicate higher figures.

Among 155 countries in a 2001 world survey, Iran under Khatami was 150th in terms of openness to the global economy. On the United Nations' Human Development scale, Iran ranked 90th out of 162 countries, only slightly better than its previous position at 97 out of 175 countries four years earlier. The overall risk of doing business in Iran improved only marginally from "D" to "C". One of his economic strategy was on the basis of absorbing foreign and domestic capital resources for privatization of the economy. Therefore, in 2001, the organization of privatization established. Also the government encourages people to buy shares in the private companies by providing incentives. Also Iran succeeded to convince the World Bank to approve loans totaling 432 billion dollar to the country.

Foreign policy

During Khatami's presidency, Iran's foreign policy began a process of moving from confrontation to conciliation. In Khatami's notion of foreign policy, there was no "clash of civilizations", he favoured instead a "Dialogue Among Civilizations". Relations with the US remained marred by mutual suspicion and distrust, but during Khatami's two terms, Tehran increasingly made efforts to play a greater role in the Persian Gulf region and beyond.

As President, Khatami met with many influential figures including Pope John Paul II, Koichiro Matsuura, Jacques Chirac, Johannes Rau, Vladimir Putin, Abdulaziz Bouteflika, Mahathir Mohamad and Hugo Chávez. In 2003, Khatami refused to meet militant Iraqi cleric Moqtada al-Sadr. However, Khatami attended Hafez al-Assad's funeral in 2000 and told new Syrian president Bashar al-Assad that "the Iranian government and people would stand by and support him".

On 8 August 1998, the Taliban massacred 4,000 Shias in the town of Mazar-i-Sharif, Afghanistan. It also attacked and killed 11 Iranian diplomats with an Iranian journalist among them. The rest of the diplomats were taken hostage. Ayatollah Khamenei ordered the amassing of troops near the Iran Afghanistan border to enter Afghanistan and fight the Taliban. Over 70,000 Iranian troops were placed along the borders of Afghanistan. Khatami halted the invasion and looked to the UN for help. Soon he was placed in talks. Later Iran entered negotiations with the Taliban, the diplomats were released. Khatami and his advisers had managed to keep Iran from entering war with the Taliban.

After the 2003 earthquake in Bam, the Iranian government rebuffed Israel's offer of assistance. On 8 April 2005, Khatami sat near Iranian-born Israeli President Moshe Katsav during the funeral of Pope John Paul II because of alphabetical order. Later, Katsav shook hands and spoke with Khatami. Katsav himself is in origin an Iranian Jew, and from a part of Iran close to Khatami's home; he stated that they had spoken about their home province. That would make this incident the first official political contact between Iran and Israel since diplomatic ties were severed in 1979.

However, after he returned to Iran, Khatami was subject to harsh criticism from conservatives for having "recognised" Israel by speaking to its president. Subsequently, the country's state-run media reported that Khatami strongly denied shaking hands and chatting with Katsav. In 2003, Iran approached the United States with proposals to negotiate all outstanding issues including the nuclear issue and a two-state settlement for Israel and the Palestinians.
In 2006, and as an ex-president, he became the highest-ranking Iranian politician to visit the United States, excluding annual diplomatic trips of chief executives to the UN headquarters in New York. He gave a speech at the Washington National Cathedral and continued his US tour by addressing Harvard University, Georgetown University and the University of Virginia.

Currency crisis

From 1995 to 2005, Khatami's administration successfully reduced the rate of fall in the value of the Iranian rial bettering even the record of Mousavi. Nevertheless, the currency continued to fall from 2,046 to 9,005 to the U.S. dollar during his term as president.

Cultural 
Khatami moderate policies also differed sharply from those of his radical opponents, who sought stricter Islamic rule. Thus, the moderate Khatami all-inclusive and pluralistic message posed a stark contrast to the reactionary stances of the earlier decades of the revolution. He represented hope for the masses who desired change that differed in nature from what they had experienced in 1979, and yet a change that preserved Iran’s Islamic republican system. In the first years of his presidency, relative freedom of the press was formed in the country and for the first time after the summer of 1360, some opposition forces were able to print publications or publish articles criticizing the performance of high-ranking officials. During this period, the Association of Iranian Journalists, the national union of journalists in Iran was established in October 1376 after Mohammad Khatami took office. National Library and Archive of Iran It was completed with Khatami's follow-up. and banned books were allowed to be printed as Kelidar. Bahram Beyzai, Abbas Kiarostami They did many activities during this period and the country's cinema space became more open. With a brief glance at this period, it can be seen that most filmmakers turned their attention to making films with social themes. Iran Music House and Music festival of Iran's regions institutes it was founded in this period. Iran's National Orchestra founded in 1998 under the conduction of Farhad Fakhreddini.

Khatami and Iran's 2004 parliamentary election

In February 2004, Parliament elections, the Guardian Council banned thousands of candidates, including most of the reformist members of the parliament and all the candidates of the Islamic Iran Participation Front party from running. This led to a win by the conservatives of at least 70% of the seats. Approximately 60% of the eligible voting population participated in the elections.

Khatami recalled his strong opposition against holding an election his government saw as unfair and not free. He also narrated the story of his visit to the Supreme Leader, Khamenei, together with the Parliament's spokesman (considered the head of the legislature) and a list of conditions they had handed him before they could hold the elections. The list, he said, was then passed on to the Guardian Council, the legal supervisor and major obstacle to holding free and competitive elections in recent years. The members of the Guardian Council are appointed directly by the Supreme Leader and were considered to be applying his will. "But", Khatami said, "the Guardian Council kept neither the Supreme Leader's nor its own word [...] and we were faced with a situation in which we had to choose between holding the election or risking huge unrest [...] and so damaging the regime". At this point, student protesters repeatedly chanted the slogan "Jannati is the nation's enemy", referring to the chairman of the Guardian Council. Khatami replied, "If you are the representative of the nation, then we are the nation's enemy". However, after a clarification by students stating that "Jannati, not Khatami", he took advantage of the opportunity to claim a high degree of freedom in Iran.

When the Guardian Council announced the final list of candidates on 30 January 125 reformist members of parliament declared that they would boycott the election and resign their seats, and the Reformist interior minister declared that the election would not be held on the scheduled date, 20 February. However, Khatami then announced that the election would be held on time, and he rejected the resignations of his cabinet ministers and provincial governors. These actions paved the way for the election to be held and signaled a split between the radical and moderate wings of the reformist movement.

Cultural and political image

Dialogue Among Civilizations

Following earlier works by the philosopher Dariush Shayegan, in early 1997, during his presidential campaign, Khatami introduced the theory of Dialogue Among Civilizations as a response to Samuel P. Huntington's "Clash of Civilizations" theory. He introduced this concept in the United Nations in 1998.

Consequently, on 4 November 1998 the UN adopted a resolution proclaiming the year 2001 as the United Nations' Year of Dialogue Among Civilizations, as per Khatami's suggestion. Pleading for the moralization of politics, Khatami argued that "the political translation of dialogue among civilizations would consist in arguing that culture, morality, and art must prevail on politics". President Khatami's call for a dialogue among civilizations elicited a published reply from an American author, Anthony J. Dennis, who served as the originator, contributor, and editor of an historic and unprecedented collection of letters addressing all facets of Islamic-Western and U.S.–Iranian relations entitled Letters to Khatami: A Reply To The Iranian President's Call For A Dialogue Among Civilizations which was published in the U.S. by Wyndham Hall Press in July 2001. To date, this book is the only published reply Khatami has ever received from the West.

Culture
Khatami believes that the modern world in which we live is such that Iranian youth are confronted with new ideas and is receptive of foreign habits. He also believes that the limitation on youth leads to separation of them from the regime and calls them into Satanic cultures. He predicted that even worse, the youth will learn and accept the MTV culture. This fact leads to secularization.

Cinema
In terms of Islamic values, Mohammad Khatami encouraged film makers to include themes such as self-sacrifice, martyrdom, and revolutionary patience. When Khatami was the minister of culture, he believed that cinema was not  limited to the mosque and it is necessary to pay attention to entertaining aspects of cinema and not limiting it to religious aspect.

Khatami as a scholar

Khatami's main research field is political philosophy. One of Khatami's academic mentors was Javad Tabatabaei, an Iranian political philosopher. Later on Khatami became a University lecturer at Tarbiat Modarres University, where he taught political philosophy. Khatami also published a book on political philosophy in 1999. The ground he covers is the same as that covered by Javad Tabatabaei: The Platonizing adaptation of Greek political philosophy by Farabi (died 950), its synthesis of the "eternal wisdom" of Persian statecraft by Abu'l-Hasan Amiri (died 991) and Mushkuya Razi (died 1030), the juristic theories of al-Mawardi and Ghazali, and Nizam al-Mulk's treatise on statecraft. He ends with a discussion of the revival of political philosophy in Safavid Isfahan in the second half of the 17th century.

Further, Khatami shares with Tabatabaei the idea of the "decline" of Muslim political thought beginning at the very outset, after Farabi.

Like Tabatabaei, Khatami brings in the sharply contrasting Aristotelian view of politics to highlight the shortcomings of Muslim political thought. Khatami has also lectured on the decline in Muslim political thought in terms of the transition from political philosophy to royal policy (siyasat-i shahi) and its imputation to the prevalence of "forceful domination" (taghallub) in Islamic history.

In his "Letter for Tomorrow", he wrote:

Post-presidential career

After his presidency, Khatami founded two NGOs which he currently heads:
 International Institute for Dialogue among Cultures & Civilizations,. This institute is a private (non-governmental) institute that was founded by Khatami after the end of his presidency and it is not to be confused with a center with a similar name operated by the foreign ministry of Iran. The European branch of Khatami's institute is headquartered in Geneva and has been registered as Foundation for Dialogue among Civilizations.
 Baran Foundation. BARAN meaning "rain" is an acronym in Persian for "Foundation for Freedom, Growth and Development of Iran". This is also a private (non-governmental) institute founded by Khatami after the end of his presidency (registration announced on 9 September 2005) and a group of his former colleagues during his presidency. This institute is focused on domestic rather than international activities.

Notable events in Khatami's career after his presidency include:

 On 2 September 2005, the then United Nations Secretary-General Kofi Annan appointed Mohammad Khatami as a member of the Alliance of Civilizations.
 On 28 September 2005, Khatami retired after 29 years of service in the government.
 On 14 November 2005, Mohammad Khatami urged all religious leaders to fight for the abolishment of atomic and chemical weapons.
 On 30 January 2006, Mohammad Khatami officially inaugurated the office of the "International Institute of Dialogue Among Civilizations", an NGO with offices in Iran and Europe that he will be heading, after his retirement from the government.
 On 15 February 2006, during a press interview Mohammad Khatami announced the formal registration of the European office of his Institute for Dialogue among Civilizations in Geneva.
 On 28 February 2006, while attending a conference of the Alliance of Civilizations at Doha, Qatar, he stated that "The Holocaust is a historical fact." However, he added that Israel has "made a bad use of this historic fact with the persecution of the Palestinian people."
 On 7 September 2006, during a visit to Washington, Mohammad Khatami called for dialogue between the United States and Iran.
On 24–28 January 2007, Mohammad Khatami attended the Annual Meeting of the World Economic Forum in Davos, Switzerland. German Chancellor Angela Merkel, then British Prime Minister Tony Blair, former U.S. President Bill Clinton, then U.S. Senator Hillary Clinton, former U.S. Vice President Al Gore, then Vice President Dick Cheney, and former U.S. Secretaries of State Madeleine Albright and Colin Powell were among those attending. Khatami and then U.S. Senator John Kerry have expressed similar opinions and shared words with each other in the World Economic Forum in Davos.
In October 2009, the award committee of the Global Dialogue Prize declared Khatami and Iranian cultural theorist Dariush Shayegan as joint winners of the inaugural award, "for their work in developing and promoting the concept of a 'dialogue among cultures and civilizations' as new paradigm of cultural subjectivity and as new paradigm of international relations". The Global Dialogue Prize is one of the world's most significant recognitions for research in the Humanities, honouring "excellence in research and research communication on the conditions and content of a global intercultural dialogue on values". In January 2010, Mohammad Khatami stated that "he was not in the position to accept the award", and the prize was given to Dariush Shayegan alone.

The Man with the Chocolate Robe
On 22 December 2005, a few months after the end of Khatami's presidency, the monthly magazine Chelcheragh, along with a group of young Iranian artists and activists, organized a ceremony in Khatami's honor. The ceremony was held on Yalda night at Tehran's Bahman Farhangsara Hall. The ceremony, titled "A Night with The Man with the Chocolate Robe" by the organizers, was widely attended by teenagers and younger adults. One of the presenters and organizers of the ceremony was Pegah Ahangarani, a popular young Iranian actress. The event did not get a lot of advance publicity, but it drew a huge amount of attention afterwards. In addition to formal reports on the event by the BBC, IRNA, and other major news agencies, googling the term "مردی با عبای شکلاتی" ("The Man with the Chocolate Robe" in Persian) shows thousands of results of mainly young Iranians' blogs mentioning the event. It was arguably the first time in the history of Iran that an event in such fashion was held in honor of a head of government. Some weblog reports of the evening described the general atmosphere of the event as "similar to a concert!", and some reported that "Khatami was treated like a pop star" among the youth and teenagers in attendance during the ceremony. Many bloggers also accused him of falling short of his promises of a safer, more democratic Iran.

2008 International Conference on Religion in Modern World
In October 2008, Khatami organized an international conference on the position of religion in the modern world. Former UN secretary-general Kofi Annan, former Norwegian Prime Minister Kjell Magne Bondevik, former Italian Prime Minister Romano Prodi, former French Prime Minister Lionel Jospin, former Swiss President Joseph Deiss, former Portuguese President Jorge Sampaio, former Irish President Mary Robinson, former Sri Lankan President Chandrika Kumaratunga and former UNESCO director general Federico Mayor as well as several other scholars were among the invited speakers of the conference.

The event was followed by a celebration of the historical city of Yazd, one of the most famous cities in Persian history and Khatami's birthplace. Khatami also announced that he is about to launch a television program to promote intercultural dialogue.

2009 presidential election

Khatami contemplated running in the 2009 Iranian presidential election. In December 2008, 194 alumni of Sharif University of Tech wrote a letter to him and asked him to run against Ahmadinejad "to save the nation". On 8 February 2009, he announced his candidacy at a meeting of pro-reform politicians.

On 16 March 2009, Khatami officially announced he would drop out of the presidential race to endorse another reformist candidate Mir-Hossein Mousavi who Khatami claimed would stand a better chance against Iran's conservative establishment to offer true change and reform.

Green movement
In December 2010, following the crushing of post-election protest, Khatami was described as working as a political "insider," drawing up a "list of preconditions" to present to the government "for the reformists' participation in the upcoming parliamentary elections", that would be seen as reasonable by the Iranian public but intolerable by the government. This was seen by some (Ata'ollah Mohajerani) as "astute" and proving "the system could not take even basic steps required for living up to its own democratic conservatives" (Azadeh Moaveni). In response to the conditions, Kayhan newspaper condemned Khatami as "a spy and traitor" and called for his execution.

2013 presidential election

A few months before presidential election which was held in June 2013, several reformist groups of Iran invited Khatami to attend in competition. The reformists also sent a letter to the Iran Supreme Leader Ayatollah Ali Khamenei in December 2012, regarding the participation of Khatami at the upcoming presidential election. Member of the traditional-conservative Islamic Coalition Party, Asadullah Badamchyan said that in their letter, the reformists asked the Supreme Leader to supervise the allowance of Khatami to participate in the upcoming election. Former mayor of Tehran, Gholamhossein Karbaschi announced: "Rafsanjani may support Khatami in presidential election".

Khatami himself said that he still waits for the positive changes in the country, and will reveal his decision when the time is suitable. On 11 June 2013, Khatami together with council of reformists backed moderate Hassan Rouhani, in Iran's presidential vote as Mohammad Reza Aref quit the race when Khatami advised him that it "would not be wise" for him to stay in the race for the June 2013 elections.

Controversy and criticism

Khatami's two terms as president were regarded by some people as unsuccessful or not fully successful in achieving their goals of making Iran freer and more democratic, and he has been criticized by conservatives, reformers, and opposition groups for various policies and viewpoints.

In a 47-page "A Letter for Tomorrow", Khatami said his government had stood for noble principles but had made mistakes and faced obstruction by hardline elements in the clerical establishment.

Electoral history

Primary sources

Publications

Khatami has written a number of books in Persian, Arabic, and English:

Books in Persian
 Fear of the Wave (بیم موج)
 From the World of a city to the city of the World (از دنیای شهر تا شهر دنیا)
 Faith and Thought Trapped by Despotism (آیین و اندیشه در دام خودکامگی)
 Democracy (مردم سالاری)
 Dialogue Among Civilizations (گفتگوی تمدن‌ها)
 A Letter for Tomorrow (نامه ای برای فردا)
 Islam, The Clergy, and The Islamic Revolution (اسلام، روحانیت و انقلاب اسلامی)
 Political Development, Economic Development, and Security (توسعه سیاسی، توسعه اقتصادی و امنیت)
 Women and the Youth (زنان و جوانان)
 Political Parties and the Councils (احزاب و شوراها)
 Reviving Inherent Religious Truths (احیاگر حقیقت دین)

Books in English
 Islam, Liberty and Development 

Books in Arabic
 A Study of Religion, Islam and Time [title roughly translated from Arabic] (مطالعات في الدين والإسلام والعصر)
 City of Politics [title roughly translated from Arabic] (مدينة السياسة)

A full list of his publications is available at his official personal web site (see below).

Awards and honors

 Gold medal from University of Athens
 The special medal of Spain's Congress of Deputies and Senate, Key to Madrid
 Honorary PhD, Moscow State Institute of International Relations
 Honorary doctorate in Philosophy from University of Moscow
 Honorary PhD degree, Tokyo Institute of Technology
 Honorary doctorate degree by the Delhi University
 Honorary doctorate from National Academy of Sciences of Azerbaijan
 Degree of honor in political sciences, Lebanese University
 Pakistan's highest civilian honour
 Plaque of honor and medal of distinction by the International Federation for Parent Education
 Honorary doctorate from Al-Neelain University
 Honorary doctorate of Law from University of St Andrews
 Venezuela's Order of the Liberator

See also
2nd of Khordad Movement
Mohammad Khatami presidential campaign, 2009
1997 Iranian presidential election
2001 Iranian presidential election
2009 Iranian presidential election
2013 Iranian presidential election
Liberal movements within Islam
Modern Islamic philosophy

References and notes

External links

 Official website of Khatami's BARAN NGO Institute in Iran
 
 Khatami and the Search for Reform in Iran (Review article; Stanford University) 
 Biography in Encyclopædia Britannica
 Khatami; from the presidency of Islamic Center in Hamburg to the presidency of Islamic Republic of Iran
 CNN: Transcript of Interview with Iranian President Mohammad Khatami
Iran's ex-leader sees new Islam
 Address of Mohammad Khatami at Annual Meeting of World Economic Forum, Davos, 21 January 2004, Chaired by Klaus Schwab, 26 min 37 sec, 

 
1943 births
Living people
Government ministers of Iran
Iranian Green Movement
Iranian librarians
Iranian reformists
Iranian scholars
20th-century Persian-language writers
University of Tehran alumni
Iranian democracy activists
Islamic democracy activists
Muslim reformers
People from Ardakan
Presidents of Iran
Iranian Shia clerics
Association of Combatant Clerics politicians
University of Isfahan alumni
Candidates in the 1997 Iranian presidential election
Candidates in the 2001 Iranian presidential election
Members of the 1st Islamic Consultative Assembly
Representatives of the Supreme Leader in the Keyhan Institute
Heads of the National Library of Iran
20th-century Iranian politicians
21st-century Iranian politicians
Imperial Iranian Army lieutenant generals